Leeanna Pendergast (born ) is a Canadian former politician. She was a Liberal member of the Legislative Assembly of Ontario from 2007 to 2011, representing the riding of Kitchener—Conestoga.

Background
Pendergast was born in Kitchener, Ontario in 1962. She obtained a bachelor's degree from the University of Waterloo. She has also studied at the University of Toronto and at Oxford University in England, receiving numerous degrees including a MA, BEd and MEd. She worked at numerous high schools in the region, serving as the vice-principal of four schools and as an education consultant for the Ministry of Children and Youth Services. Pendergast has helped develop various programs for youth in Kitchener, including the Safe Schools Initiative and the Breakfast Program for Needy Students. She has also chaired the Education Foundation golf classic, raising money for literacy and numeracy initiatives.

She and her husband, Richard, have lived in Conestogo, just outside Kitchener, and is a Vice-Principal at Sir John A. MacDonald Public School. She has three sons, Adam, Alexander and Benjamin.

Politics
In the 2007 provincial election she was elected in the riding of Kitchener—Conestoga defeating Progressive Conservative candidate Michael Harris by about 1,500 votes. On October 30, 2007, she was named the parliamentary assistant to the Minister Responsible for Women's Issues, Deb Matthews.

On September 11, 2009, Pendergast was named the parliamentary assistant to the Minister of Education. She was the co-chair of the Working Group on Financial Literacy, tasked with submitting a report to the curriculum council with recommendations on how to seamlessly integrate financial literacy into the Ontario curriculum from Grades 4 to 12.

In the 2011 provincial election, Pendergast faced Michael Harris again. This time, Harris defeated Pendergast by 3,700 votes.

References

External links

1962 births
Alumni of the University of Oxford
Canadian educators
Living people
Ontario Liberal Party MPPs
Politicians from Kitchener, Ontario
People from Woolwich, Ontario
University of Toronto alumni
University of Waterloo alumni
Women MPPs in Ontario
21st-century Canadian politicians
21st-century Canadian women politicians